"Raoul and the Kings of Spain" is a song by the band Tears for Fears, released as the first single from their 1995 album of the same name. Upon its release, the single reached #31 in the UK and would be the band's last Top 40 hit there for ten years (until 2005's "Closest Thing to Heaven"). The song also reached #39 in Belgium (Wallonia) and #26 in Poland.

Background

In a TV interview in 1995, Roland Orzabal explained that "Raoul is a name that has been in my family for many generations, [...] I was actually born Raoul, and my mother [...] decided that after two weeks she would change it to Roland to make it easier for English people to pronounce. So it became my nickname, and then when I had my first son [...] we decided to hand it on to him."

Orzabal further explained that "The Kings of Spain" is a reference to his family history and lineage from his father's side (his father was of Spanish-Basque descent, and his grandfather was Argentinian). Orzabal stated that, in particular, his father told him "that my great great grandmother was the cousin of the president of Argentina, so really the album should have been called Raoul and the Presidents of Argentina, but not a lot of things rhyme with Argentina."

The track was first performed two years prior to its release on the band's 1993 Elemental World Tour.

Music video
The video for the song was filmed at The Mission Inn Hotel & Spa in Riverside, California. The Inn is a listed historic landmark, and was where Bette Davis married in 1945. The video features Orzabal with his full supporting band including guitarist Alan Griffiths (who co-wrote and co-produced the song) and bass player Gail Ann Dorsey.

Track listing

UK 2-CD set
Disc 1
 "Raoul and the Kings of Spain" - 5:15
 "Queen of Compromise" (Roland Orzabal, Alan Griffiths, Brian Macleod, Jebin Bruni, Gail Ann Dorsey, Jeffrey Trott) - 3:52
 "All of the Angels" (Roland Orzabal, Alan Griffiths) - 4:25

Disc 2
 "Raoul and the Kings of Spain" - 5:15
 "Creep" (Live in Birmingham) - 4:55 (Radiohead cover)
 "The Madness of Roland" (Roland Orzabal, Alan Griffiths) - 5:09

UK CD5 Promo 
 "Raoul and The Kings of Spain" (Special Version) - 4:32

German CD5 Promo 
 "Raoul and The Kings of Spain" (Edit) - 4:43

Notes 
 The verse melody of this song is the same as in the Simple Minds' song "Kick It In".

References

Songs about families
Songs about kings
Songs about Spain
1995 singles
Tears for Fears songs
Songs written by Roland Orzabal